Anthology: 1995–2010 is the second posthumous compilation album by Prince, released digitally by NPG Records, in association with Legacy Recordings, through streaming platforms including Spotify and Apple Music on August 17, 2018.

Album information 
The compilation was released at the same time that the Prince estate allowed most of Prince's latter period albums—from 1995's The Gold Experience to 2010's 20Ten—to be made available for the first time on streaming platforms other than Tidal, which was previously the only streaming service to have exclusive rights to the catalog from that era. The album was curated with the help of Prince's estate and comprises 37 songs.

One major omission, noted by fans and the press, was Prince's only UK number-one single "The Most Beautiful Girl in the World", from 1995. This was due to a long-running copyright dispute that had not been settled by the time of Prince's death in 2016, effectively leaving the song in limbo; not being able to be re-released. This also left The Gold Experience reissue in doubt for years.

Track listing

Charts

References

2018 compilation albums
Albums produced by Prince (musician)
Prince (musician) compilation albums
Compilation albums published posthumously
Legacy Recordings compilation albums
NPG Records compilation albums